Brian Joseph Langton (born 24 January 1948) is a former Australian Labor Party politician, who served both as mayor of Kogarah in the St George area of Sydney and as the member for Kogarah in the New South Wales Legislative Assembly. In 1998 Langton was found by the Independent Commission Against Corruption (ICAC) to have been involved in corruption, having deceptively lodged travel allowances.

Early years
Brian was born in the Sydney suburb of Maroubra. He went to school at Marist Brothers, Kogarah and showed an early interest in politics, being elected to Kogarah Council in 1971 at the age of just 23. He served on the council for twelve years and was elected mayor in 1979 and 1980.

Political career
In 1983, Langton was elected to the New South Wales Parliament as a Labor Party member for Kogarah and served continuously in that role for sixteen years. When Labor formed a government in 1995, Brian Langton was appointed a minister, looking after the portfolios of Transport and Tourism from April 1995 to December 1997 and then Fair Trading and Emergency Services in December 1997.

In April 1998, Langton relinquished his ministerial duties due to his involvement in a political scandal, after the Independent Commission Against Corruption (ICAC) found him guilty of corruptly rorting charter plane expenses. The ICAC deemed that Langton had sought advantage for himself by deliberate deception of the Parliamentary Accounts Department. Langton stepped down at the 1999 state election, and left politics with a $90,000 indexed entitlement.

Outside of parliament, he was an investment banker and manager of a travel company. He is married with three daughters.

In May 2008, the New South Wales Transport Minister, John Watkins, appointed Langton to the position of Chairman of Sydney Ferries.

References

Members of the New South Wales Legislative Assembly
Australian Labor Party mayors
1948 births
Living people
Mayors of places in New South Wales
Australian Labor Party members of the Parliament of New South Wales